Arkavazi Rural District is a rural district (dehestan) in Chavar District, Ilam County, Ilam Province, Iran. At the 2006 census, its population was 4,640, in 935 families.  The rural district has 37 villages.

References 

Rural Districts of Ilam Province
Ilam County